In telecommunications and fiber optics, ovality or noncircularity is the degree of deviation from perfect circularity of the cross section of the core or cladding of the fiber.

The cross-sections of the core and cladding are assumed to a first approximation to be elliptical, and ovality is defined to be twice the third flattening of the ellipse, where a is the length of the major axis and b is the length of the minor axis. Alternatively, ovality of the core or cladding may be specified by a tolerance field consisting of two concentric circles, within which the cross section boundaries must lie.

In measurements, ovality is the amount of out-of-roundness of a hole or cylindrical part in the typical form of an oval.

In chemistry
In computational chemistry, especially in QSAR studies, ovality refers to, a measure of how the shape of a molecule approaches a sphere (at one extreme) or a cigar shape (at the other). 
Ovality is described by a ratio of volume to area:

where:

O = Ovality
A = Area
V = Volume

The ovality of the He atom is 1.0 and that of HC24H (12 triple bonds) is ~1.7.

See also
Concentricity error
Roundness (object)

References

Federal Standard 1037C

Fiber optics